Inger René (born 1937) is a Swedish politician of the Moderate Party. She has been a member of the Riksdag since 1991.

External links
Inger René at the Riksdag website

Members of the Riksdag from the Moderate Party
Living people
1937 births
Women members of the Riksdag
Members of the Riksdag 2002–2006
21st-century Swedish women politicians